Anterior inferior may refer to:

 Anterior inferior cerebellar artery
 Anterior inferior iliac spine
 Anterior tibiofibular ligament
 Anterior inferior pancreaticoduodenal artery